Faunis is a genus of Asian butterflies in the family Nymphalidae. They are among the butterflies commonly known as fauns. They are relatively small-sized amathusiins, subtly colored in soft browns and violets, and range from China to the Philippines and Sulawesi.

Larvae are found on Musa, Smilax, and Pandanus host plants.

Many forms, whether species or subspecies, are restricted to islands and are probably vulnerable.

Species list 
Based on Markku Savela's Lepidoptera and Some Other Life Forms. Years given are the actual publication dates where known.

 Faunis Hübner, 1819 (= Clerome Westwood, 1850)
 Faunis aerope (Leech, 1890)
 Faunis aerope aerope (Leech, 1890)
 Faunis aerope excelsa Fruhstorfer, 1911
 Faunis aerope masseyeffi Brooks, 1949
 Faunis aerope longpoensis Huang, 2001
 Faunis arcesilaus (Fabricius, 1787) originally Papilio arcesilaus Fabricius, 1787
 Faunis assama (Westwood, 1858)
 Faunis canens Hübner, 1826
 Faunis canens canens Hübner, 1826
 Faunis canens arcesilas Stichel, 1933
 Faunis canens borneensis Fruhstorfer
 Faunis canens pallidior Hagan
 Faunis canens samadhi Fruhstorfer
 Faunis canens niasana Fruhstorfer
 Faunis eumeus (Drury, 1773) originally Papilio eumeus Drury, 1773
 Faunis eumeus eumeus (Drury, 1773)
 Faunis eumeus incerta Staudinger
 Faunis gracilis (Butler, 1867) originally Clerome gracilis Butler, 1867
 Faunis kirata (de Nicéville, 1891) originally Clerome kirata de Nicéville, 1891
 Faunis menado (Hewitson, 1863)
 Faunis menado menado (Hewitson, 1863)
 Faunis menado pleonasma Röber
 Faunis menado chitone Hewitson
 Faunis menado intermedia Röber
 Faunis menado syllus Fruhstorfer
 Faunis menado suluana Fruhstorfer
 Faunis phaon Erichson, 1834
 Faunis phaon leucis (Felder & Felder, 1861)
 Faunis phaon phaon Erichson, 1834
 Faunis phaon lurida Felder
 Faunis phaon ikonion Fruhstorfer
 Faunis phaon sibuyanensis Yamaguchi & Aoki
 Faunis sappho Semper, 1878
 Faunis sappho sappho Semper, 1878
 Faunis sappho kleis Semper
 Faunis sappho ameinokleia Fruhstorfer
 Faunis stomphax (Westwood, 1858)
 Faunis stomphax stomphax (Westwood, 1858)
 Faunis stomphax plateni Staudinger

References

External links
Images representing Faunis at EOL

 
Nymphalidae genera
Taxa named by Jacob Hübner
Amathusiini